Out from Out Where is the fifth studio album by Brazilian electronic music producer Amon Tobin. It was released on 14 October 2002 by Ninja Tune.

Release
Out from Out Where was released on 14 October 2002 by the Ninja Tune label. "Verbal" was issued as the sole single from Out from Out Where on 7 October 2002. The music video for the song was directed by Alex Rutterford and appears as bonus enhanced content on the CD edition of the album. A music video was also produced for the track "Proper Hoodidge", directed by Corine Stübi.

In 2010, Out from Out Where was awarded a gold certification by the Independent Music Companies Association, indicating sales of at least 100,000 copies in Europe.

The song Mighty Micro People appears in the 2008 racing game Need for Speed: Undercover .

Track listing

Personnel
Credits are adapted from the album's liner notes.

 Amon Tobin – production
 MC Decimal R. – performance on "Verbal"
 Openmind – design
 She-T – logo design

Charts

References

External links
 Out from Out Where at official Ninja Tune website (includes audio clips)
 
 

2002 albums
Amon Tobin albums
Ninja Tune albums